Ronald Earl Gassert (July 22, 1940 – October 8, 2022) was an American football defensive tackle in the National Football League for the Green Bay Packers. 

Gassert graduated in 1957 from Rancocas Valley Regional High School in Mount Holly, New Jersey. He played college football at the University of Virginia, where he was a defensive end.

Gassert was drafted by the Packers in the fourth round (56th overall) of the 1962 NFL Draft.   He was also drafted by the Buffalo Bills in the 13th round (99th overall) of the 1962 American Football League Draft.

Ron was a member of the 1962 NFL Championship Green Bay Packers. In 1966, Gassert finished his career with the Philadelphia Bulldogs of the Continental Football League, helping to lead the team to the 1966 CFL Championship.

Gassert penned a fictional western novel titled Driven.

After working for 30 years as a banker, Gassert and his wife began a business building furniture that they sold at craft shows. A resident of Medford, New Jersey, Gassert served on the board of education of the Lenape Regional High School District.

Gassert died on October 8, 2022, at the age of 82.

References

1940 births
2022 deaths
People from Medford, New Jersey
People from Lebanon County, Pennsylvania
Sportspeople from Burlington County, New Jersey
Players of American football from New Jersey
Players of American football from Pennsylvania
American football defensive tackles
Rancocas Valley Regional High School alumni
Virginia Cavaliers football players
Green Bay Packers players